CIER may refer to:

 Centre for International Education and Research
 Chung-Hua Institution for Economic Research, an institution in Taiwan
 CIER-TV, a low-power community television station in Ear Falls, Ontario, Canada